Mundulea is a genus of flowering plants in the legume family, Fabaceae. It belongs to the subfamily Faboideae.

Species
There are some 13 to 14 accepted species. M. striata is often considered a synonym of M. sericea subsp. madagascariensis Du Puy & Labat.
 Mundulea anceps "R.Vig., p.p."
 Mundulea ankazobeensis Du Puy & Labat
 Mundulea antanossarum Baill.
 Mundulea barclayi (Hook.) Du Puy
 Mundulea chapelieri (Baill.) Du Puy & Labat
 Mundulea laxiflora Baker
 Mundulea menabeensis R.Vig.
 Mundulea micrantha R.Vig.
 Mundulea obovata Du Puy & Labat
 Mundulea pondoensis Codd
 Mundulea sericea (Willd.) A.Chev.
 Mundulea stenophylla R.Vig.
 Mundulea viridis "R.Vig., p.p.A"

References

External links

Millettieae
Fabaceae genera
Taxa named by Augustin Pyramus de Candolle